California Southern University is a private, for-profit, university in Costa Mesa, California. California Southern University is currently a member of the American InterContinental University System. It offers associate's, bachelor's, master's and doctoral degree programs online in psychology, business and management, risk management and regulatory compliance, criminal justice, nursing, and education.

History
The university was established in California on December 27, 1978, by Dr. Donald Hecht as a traditional correspondence school, and received its initial approval to offer degree programs from the California Department of Education. It originally offered associate level programs, then expanded to bachelor's, master's, and doctoral degrees. During the 1990s, the university added distance learning programs in the fields of business, psychology and law. The university is now recognized as an online degree granting institution.

Until June 2007, the university was known as the Southern California University for Professional Studies (SCUPS) and was located in Anaheim, California.

In 2022, the university was acquired by the American InterContinental University System and joined into the overall AIUS community.

California Southern University offers bachelor's, master's and professional doctorate degrees entirely online without physical attendance on campus. The university was institutionally accredited by the Western Association of Schools and Colleges (WASC) before acquired by American InterContinental University System. The WASC Senior College and University Commission (”the Commission”) provides regional accreditation for a diverse membership of public and private higher education institutions throughout California, Hawaii, and the Pacific as well as a limited number of institutions outside the U.S. Through its work of peer review, based on standards agreed to by the membership, the Commission encourages continuous institutional improvement and assures the membership and its constituencies, including the public, that accredited institutions are fulfilling their missions in service to their students and the public good.

The WASC Senior College and University Commission is recognized by the U.S. Department of Education and Council for Higher Education Accreditation (CHEA) for certifying institutional eligibility for federal funding in a number of educational and vocational programs, including granting student access to student financial aid.

The California Southern School of Business received programmatic accreditation from the Accreditation Council for Business Schools and Programs (ACBSP).

The California Southern School of Nursing's baccalaureate and master's degree programs received programmatic accreditation by the Commission on Collegiate Nursing Education (CCNE).

Memberships
California Southern University is a member of the California Association of Private Postsecondary Schools (CAPPS), and "Silver Sponsor" in the United States Distance Learning Association (USDLA). The California Southern University School of Business is an "Educational Member" of the International Assembly for Collegiate Business Education (IACBE).

Programs
Most Popular Programs:
California Southern University offers 12 degree programs and 10 post-baccalaureate certificate programs.  The most popular programs are the master's degrees in business and psychology, and the Doctor of Psychology and the Doctor of Business Administration.

School of Law

The California Southern University School of Law is an unaccredited correspondence law school which offers two graduate-level degrees, the Master of Science in Law (MSL) and the Juris Doctor (J.D.). However, the university is not currently enrolling new learners in the School of Law.  The school is registered with the Committee of Bar Examiners of the State Bar of California as a "Registered Unaccredited Correspondence Law School", which is sufficient to qualify its graduates to sit for the California Bar Examination provided they complete 864 hours of preparation (per year) and study over four years. A typical JD degree at an accredited institution is three years. It is not registered with or accredited by the American Bar Association.

Bar Examination Pass Rate
In the February administration of the California Bar Examination in 2020, one of 14 takers passed the examination, for a pass rate of seven percent.  For the years 2008 through 2013, 20 graduates have taken the California Bar Examination as first-time takers; of that number, five passed the examination for a pass rate of 25 percent.

Commencement
The 2022 California Southern University Commencement Ceremony in Anaheim, California had been set for Friday, October 14, 2022.

2022 Commencement Recap on YouTube: https://www.youtube.com/watch?v=1Tt-zZ37xvs

Notable alumni
Pam Blackwell - Educator
Clifford Mayes - Scholar

See also
 List of colleges and universities in California

References

External links
 

Schools accredited by the Western Association of Schools and Colleges
Education in California
Distance education institutions based in the United States
Educational institutions established in 1978
For-profit universities and colleges in the United States
1978 establishments in California
Costa Mesa, California
Private universities and colleges in California